Ardmore is a village and townland in County Londonderry, Northern Ireland. In the 2001 Census it had a population of 210. It is within Derry and Strabane district. Ardmore has a number of sports teams including cricket, soccer and Gaelic football.

Sport
Ardmore Cricket Club

Railways
The Londonderry and Coleraine Railway opened the Ardmore railway station on 4 July 1883.

It closed on 1 January 1933.

References

NI Neighbourhood Information System
Lewis, 1837

Villages in County Londonderry
Townlands of County Londonderry
Derry and Strabane district